Rafael Mendiluce Elizondo (31 July 1939 – 29 May 2014) was a Spanish football striker and coach.
He played for Real Sociedad B between 1957 and 1962, scoring 16 goals in 78 matches.
In 1962 he made his debut for the first team. He played for Real Sociedad from 1962 to 1973, when he retired. He scored a total of 32 goals in 302 matches.

Later he would coach Real Sociedad's youth team and Real Sociedad B between 1982 and 1985.

References

External links
 

1939 births
2014 deaths
People from Andoain
Spanish footballers
Footballers from the Basque Country (autonomous community)
Association football defenders
La Liga players
Segunda División players
Real Sociedad footballers
Spanish football managers
Real Sociedad B footballers
Real Sociedad B managers